Graves House is a historic home located at Yanceyville, Caswell County, North Carolina.  It was built about 1780, and is a tripartite Georgian style frame dwelling consisting of a three bay by four bay center section flanked by wings one bay wide and three bays deep.

Recorded by the Historic American Buildings Survey in April 1940, It was added to the National Register of Historic Places in 1974.

References

Houses on the National Register of Historic Places in North Carolina
Georgian architecture in North Carolina
Houses completed in 1780
Houses in Caswell County, North Carolina
National Register of Historic Places in Caswell County, North Carolina